Enrico Clerici (15 October 1862 – 26 August 1938) was an Italian mineralogist and geologist. From 1903 on he worked at the University of Rome. He published in 1907 the composition of a solution with a density of 4.25 g/cm3 at 20 °C, to determine the density of minerals. The Clerici solution is a mixture of thallium formate (Tl(CHO2)) and thallium malonate (Tl(C3H3O4)) in water.

References

1862 births
1938 deaths
20th-century Italian geologists
Italian mineralogists
Academic staff of the Sapienza University of Rome
19th-century Italian geologists